Dr. Tariq Mustafa (born 1934) is a Pakistani mechanical engineer with a first class honors degree from London University specializing in nuclear and space technology. He led the establishment of Pakistan's Space and Rocket Technology Program and subsequently, served in high ranking positions in the Government of Pakistan as Federal Secretary of the Ministries of Defense Production, Science and Technology, Public Sector Industry, Petroleum and Natural Resources and Privatization.  He is the founder and current Chairperson of Pakistan's National Paralympics Committee (PNPC), President of the South Asian Paralympics Committee and the Vice President of the Asian Paralympic Committee. His lifelong interests are reason, revelation and the future of humanity. He has been active in discourse about science and religion and is the author of The Case for God - Based on Reason and Evidence, not Groundless Faith.
In September 2015, he has been appointed as a member of the Governing Council of the Institute for Religion in the Age of Science (IRAS).

Education 

Dr. Tariq Mustafa is a graduate of University of London where he received his Bachelor of Science (B.S.) in mechanical engineering with first class honours while also doing an engineering apprenticeship at the Royal Arsenal in Woolwich. He also received an Honorary DSc from University of Greenwich in 2013. In 1956, he joined the United Kingdom Atomic Energy Authority and did his post-graduate research in the field of nuclear technology and nuclear power studies. In 1957, Tariq Mustafa attended the first international Reactor School at the United Kingdom Atomic Energy Research Establishment Harwell. Subsequently, he participated in the first international power reactor operations course at Calder Hall, UK. Tariq Mustafa was selected in 1957 by Nobel Laureate Abdul Salam to join the Pakistan Atomic Energy Commission. He was then selected for a Fellowship to the Oak Ridge National Laboratories of the U.S Atomic Energy Commission.

Space career 
In 1961, Tariq Mustafa was appointed to lead the team to establish Pakistan's first rocket range in Sonmiani (Baluchistan) and the launching of the Rehbar-1 and Shahpar series of rockets after receiving training at the Wallops Island range and Goddard Space Flight Center of NASA. On 7 June 1962 at 1953 hours, Pakistan launched its first solid-fuel rocket into space.
Later, Tariq Mustafa worked closely with Prof. Abdul Salam and Dr. I.H. Usmani (Chairman PAEC) and led the effort to obtain rocket manufacturing technology from France and established rocket manufacturing plants near Mauripur, Karachi.

He was the pioneer of Nike-Cajun and Judi-Dart, a solid fuel propellent based rocket. He closely collaborated with NASA scientists and engineers in the development of solid fuel sounding rockets during the 1960s, particularly the Judi-Dart Sounding Rocket Program. He associated with NASA's missile and space rocket program under the mutual agreement with the SUPARCO.

Pakistan Defense Production Program 
When Prime Minister Zulfikar Ali Bhutto decided to expand and modernize Pakistan's defense, research and production facilities, Tariq Mustafa was brought in as Joint Secretary of the newly formed Defense Production Division in 1974 where he quickly rose to the positions of Additional Secretary and finally Additional Secretary in charge of the Division in 1979. He was one of the few non-CSP officers to make it to the most senior level of the Civil Service.  Over this period Tariq Mustafa guided the establishment of manufacturing facilities for aircraft, tanks, submarines, missile boats and expanded and modernized the production of arms and artillery at their ordnance factories.

From 1981 to 1986, Tariq Mustafa was appointed Minister Technical at the Pakistan Embassy in Washington D.C to look after the technical interface between US and Pakistan in both the areas of defense and civilian industries.

In 1986, Prime Minister Muhammad Khan Junejo appointed him as Federal Secretary of Defense Production during which he acquired new and modern weapon systems from France, US, Britain and China and the local production of these systems was established.

Government and Public Service 
During his 36-year career he has widely travelled to over fifty countries. He retired from the government of Pakistan in 1994 as a Senior Federal Secretary. Since then, he has devoted himself to the international discourse on Science and Religion and authored a book, Case for God - Based on Reason and Evidence, not Groundless Faith and has been a regular participant in several conferences related to this field.

From 1989 to 1990, he served as the Chairman, Board of Governors of the Asia Pacific of Technology Transfer (APCCT) ESCAP.

After retirement, from 1995 to 1997 he was appointed as a World Bank Advisor on Privatization to Pakistan and then World Bank Advisor on Technology, where one of his most significant contribution was leading a successful outcome of the highly charged privatization of the Kot Addu thermal power plant, Asia's largest and most contentious privatization of the time as it was vehemently opposed by the labor unions

Since 1998 he has served as the President of the Pakistan Paralympics Committee, President of the South Asian Paralympics Committee and Vice President of the Asian Paralympics Committee. Under his stewardship, Pakistan has participated in the International Paralympic Games in Athens (2004), Beijing (2008), London (2012) as well as Asian and Regional games in which Pakistan team won over 55 medals, including 18 Gold medals

He has been a 'Searcher' all his life and is working on a project on the future of humankind, as he passionately believes that the existential challenges in the areas of population explosion, climate change, depletion of resources, spread of weapons of mass destruction and the rise of extremism cannot be controlled by business as usual but require a paradigm shift in our way of thinking. In a rapidly globalizing world, driven by the march of technology where our political, social, educational and religious institutions have failed to keep pace, he believes that major changes in our operating software are called for.

On acknowledgement of his services in the field of atomic energy, space technology and his work in the promotion of the Paralympics movement, the University of Greenwich awarded Tariq Mustafa an Honorary D.Sc (Doctorate of Science) in July 2013

Awards 
 Tamgha-e-Imtiaz (Medal of Distinction), 1963
 Honorary Commander, Pakistan Navy (1973)
 Honorary D.Sc - University of Greenwich, United Kingdom (2013)

Publications

Bibliography 
 Revelation: Criteria to Evaluate the Authenticity (2008)
 The Case for God: Based on Reason and Evidence (2009)
 The Future of Humanity.

Research papers 
 Selected Articles The Case for God
 Danish Cartoon Controversy
 Newsweek- The God Debate
 Talk- Islamic Wedding
 The Way Out- Bin Laden

References

External links 
 http://www.tariqmustafa.com
 http://www.linkedin.com/pub/dr-tariq-mustafa/53/b6b/229
 http://muslim-science.com/muslim-worlds-first-rocket-scientist/
 http://www.futureofhumankind.org/

Pakistani nuclear physicists
Pakistani nuclear engineers
Pakistani aerospace engineers
Pakistani mechanical engineers
Pakistani scholars
Project-706
Recipients of the Pride of Performance
Alumni of the University of London
Space and Upper Atmosphere Research Commission people
Living people
1935 births
Recipients of Tamgha-e-Imtiaz